Scooby Snacks: The Collection is a budget compilation album by the band Fun Lovin' Criminals. The compilation is notable for containing a previously rare track "Blues For Suckers" (a Schmoove version of "Bear Hug") which was available on their 1995 debut EP Original Soundtrack For Hi-Fi Living and was the only song from the EP that was not re-issued on the group's 1996 debut album Come Find Yourself.

Track listing
 "Scooby Snacks (Schmoove Version)" – 3:23
 "The Fun Lovin' Criminal" – 3:13
 "Korean Bodega" – 2:48
 "Bombin' the L" – 3:51
 "I'm Not in Love" – 4:40
 "10th Street" – 2:24
 "Bear Hug" – 3:29
 "Half a Block" – 4:22
 "Blues for Suckers" – 3:50
 "We Have All the Time in the World (Copa Cabana Version)" – 2:47
 "I Can't Get With That" – 4:23
 "Up on the Hill" – 4:29
 "Bump" – 3:45
 "Where the Bums Go" – 2:59

CD Track listing Barcode 7 24359 02062 4
 "The Fun Lovin' Criminal" – 3:11
 "Bombin' the L" – 3:49
 "Bear Hug" – 3:27
 "Blues for Suckers" – 3:48
 "I Can't Get With That" – 4:23
 "10th Street" – 2:22
 "Korean Bodega" – 2:47
 "Up on the Hill" – 4:26
 "I'm Not in Love" – 4:36
 "We Have All the Time in the World (Copa Cabana Version)" – 2:44
 "Scooby Snacks (Schmoove Version)" – 3:21
 "Bump" – 3:42
 "Half a Block" – 4:19
 "Where the Bums Go" – 2:57

2003 compilation albums
Fun Lovin' Criminals albums
EMI Records compilation albums